James Michael Wessinger (born September 25, 1955 in Utica, New York, United States) is a former second baseman, pinch hitter and pinch runner for the Atlanta Braves in 1979.

The right-handed Wessinger attended Notre Dame High School in Utica and then Le Moyne College prior to being drafted by the Braves in the sixth round of the 1976 amateur draft.

He made his major league debut on August 9, 1979 at the age of 23. He appeared in both games of a doubleheader that day, pinch running for Pepe Frias in the first game and starting the second game before being replaced by Jerry Royster. He spent a total of 10 games in the big leagues that year, hitting .000 in seven at-bats, though he did score two runs. He appeared in his final game on September 24, 1979, a day shy of his 24th birthday.

Though his major league career was relatively short, his minor league career lasted five seasons. In 524 minor league games, Wessinger hit .266 with 14 home runs. In just 98 games in 1979, he hit .297 with five home runs and 53 runs scored.

References

External links

Living people
1955 births
Atlanta Braves players
Baseball players from New York (state)
Le Moyne Dolphins baseball players
Greenwood Braves players
Kingsport Braves players
Richmond Braves players
Savannah Braves players
Sportspeople from Utica, New York